The Esslingen am Neckar trolleybus system serves the city of Esslingen am Neckar, in the Land of Baden-Württemberg, Germany.

Opened on 10 July 1944, the system had two lines, and nine trolleybuses, as at 2011.

See also
Esslingen (Neckar) station
List of trolleybus systems in Germany

References

External links

Trolleybus city: Esslingen (Germany) at Trolleymotion (German, with automated translation to English and other languages available on-site) 
 

Esslingen (district)
Esslingen am Neckar
Esslingen am Neckar